Count Axel Otto Mörner (8 June 1774 – 20 October 1852) was a Swedish artist and general.

Family
Mörner was born in Lekaryd Parish in Jönköping County, Sweden and was the son of Lieutenant Colonel Count Carl Gustaf Mörner and Sofia Elisabet Steuch. He was the brother of Hampus Mörner, Charlotta Mörner, Gustaf Fredrik Mörner and Carl Stellan Mörner.

Personal life
On 4 October 1801 he married Ebba Modée at Rosersberg Palace.

References

1774 births
1852 deaths
Swedish artists
Swedish Army lieutenant generals
Napoleonic Wars prisoners of war held by Norway
Swedish military personnel of the Napoleonic Wars
Members of the Royal Swedish Academy of War Sciences
Swedish Ministers for Defence
Recipients of the Pour le Mérite (military class)